The 2003 OFC U-17 Championship was the 10th edition of the OFC's under-17 Championship. It was held in American Samoa, Australia and New Caledonia.

The winning side qualified for the 2003 FIFA U-17 World Championship in Finland.

Australia won their ninth (and third consecutive) title after beating New Caledonia 7–1 over two legs in the final.

Host selection
Solomon Islands were originally selected as the host nation for Group B, but agreed to move the Group to Australia due to safety concerns.

Australia and New Caledonia agreed to stage both legs of the final in New Caledonia.

Qualification
All member teams qualified automatically. Papua New Guinea withdrew before the tournament began.

The following teams participated in the tournament:

Venues
Matches were played in three cities: Veterans Memorial Stadium in Tafuna, Maroochydore Soccer Centre in Maroochydore and Stade Pentecost in Noumea.

Squads

Nations named squads of up to 20 players for the tournament.

Group stage

Group A
Times are listed in Samoa Standard Time

Group B
Times are listed in Australian Eastern Standard Time (AEST)

Knockout stage

Final

First leg

Second leg

 Australia qualified for the 2003 FIFA U-17 World Cup.

Goalscorers
13 goals
 Richard Cardozo

6 goals
 Matt Hilton
 Osea Vakatalesau

5 goals

 Adam Casey
 Maciu Dunadamu
 Mone Wamowe

4 goals

 Albert Hnageje
 Kris Bright
 Michael Fifi
 Benjamin Totori
 Victor Maleb

3 goals

 Eric Paartalu
 Kristian Sarkies
 Tim Smits
 Ricky Broderson
 Jason Hayne
 Hiro Poroiae
 John Alick Harry

2 goals

 Dane Richardson
 Johnny Rao
 Raphael Boanemoa
 Craig Henderson
 Steven Old
 Jesse Scott
 Michael White
 Richard Anisua
 Earl Honitalo
 Timothy Joe
 Roger Joe
 Sylverstone Kanegai

1 goal

 Ramin Ott
 Matthew Deegan
 Evangelos Karavitis
 Adrian Leijer
 Angelo Martino
 Oliver Totani
 Frank Jim
 Geoffrey Strickland
 Sheikar Prakashi
 Noa Seru
 Aeron Singh
 Joshua Wilson
 Kenjy Vendegou
 Croyden Wheeler
 Kennedy Faalavaau
 Pio Manila
 James Slater
 Augustine Anisi
 Leslie Haikai
 Jeffrey Horoinima
 David Ramoaea
 Jeff Horoi
 Tinomana Sinjoux
 Jason Tahi
 Matahi Teriitaumihau
 Peni Pau
 Charles Ligo
 Manuel Peter
 Raul Peter
 John Mark Simeon
 Georges Tabe
 John Varaismaite

Own goals
 Albert Nauer (playing against Fiji)

References
RSSSF Tournament Overview
OFC 2003 U-17 Championship official media releases

External links
Official OFC website

OFC U-17 Championship
2003 in youth association football